Werner Grünzweig (born 1959) is an Austrian musicologist and archivist.

Life 
Born in Graz, Grünzweig first studied piano at the University of Music and Performing Arts Graz, and from 1984 musicology and American studies at the Freie Universität Berlin. He graduated with an M.A. in 1989. In 1995 he was awarded the M.A. with the work Ahnung und Wissen, Geist und Form : Alban Berg als Musikschriftsteller und Analytiker der Musik Arnold Schönbergs (published 2000 at the Universal Edition Vienna). Since 1994 Grünzweig has been head of the music archive of the Academy of Arts, Berlin.

Selected publications 
 Werner Grünzweig, Gesine Schröder, Martin Supper (editors): Dieter Schnebel 60. Wolke, Hofheim 1990, .
 : Von innen und außen. Schriften über Musik, Musikleben und Ästhetik Hg. v. Werner Grünzweig und Gottfried Krieger. Wolke, Hofheim 1993. 
 Werner Grünzweig: Ahnung und Wissen, Geist und Form. Alban Berg als Musikschriftsteller und Analytiker der Musik Arnold Schönbergs. Wien; Universal Edition; 2000; 320 pages. 
 Werner Grünzweig: Hans Zender vielstimmig in sich. Stiftung Archiv der Akademie der Künste. Hofheim; Wolke-Verlag 2008; 118 pages.

References

External links 
 Wiederkehr des Verdrängten öffentlich machen

1959 births
Living people
Writers from Graz
Austrian musicologists
Austrian archivists
University of Music and Performing Arts Graz alumni